Bayan Lepas is a town in the Malaysian state of Penang. It is located within the Southwest Penang Island District, near the southeastern tip of Penang Island. Founded in the 19th century, Bayan Lepas has various industries.

History 

Bayan Lepas was believed to have been named after a wealthy Sumatran family who founded the town in the late 19th century. Upon coming ashore, their parakeet escaped, and was given the name Bayan Lepas, which meant 'escaped parakeet' in Malay.

The "old town" Bayan Lepas is located at the intersection of Jalan Bayan Lepas and Jalan Dato Ismail Hashim, to the west of the Penang International Airport. 

The British also built a fortification at nearby Batu Maung to defend Penang Island and the RAF Butterworth Air Base on the mainland against amphibious invasion. However, the fort was abandoned after the advancing Imperial Japanese Army during World War II.

Until the 1970s, Bayan Lepas was a relatively rural village, with rice farming being the main economic activity. As a result, the town was nicknamed the "rice bowl" of Penang.

In 1972, the then Chief Minister of Penang, Lim Chong Eu, opened the Bayan Lepas Free Industrial Zone to alleviate an economic crisis and rising unemployment that was in Penang.

Demographics 
The mukim of Bayan Lepas also encompasses the surrounding neighbourhoods such as Batu Maung, Bayan Baru and Sungai Ara, along with the town itself. According to the 2010 National Census conducted by Malaysia's Department of Statistics, the mukim of Bayan Lepas had a population of 122,654. This makes Bayan Lepas the largest town within the Southwest Penang Island District, containing the majority of the district's population.

Manufacturing 
Bayan Lepas Free Industrial Zone and Technoplex area is the centre of electric and electronics manufacturing. Due to the presence of multinational firms in Bayan Lepas, the town has received a lot of foreign direct investment (FDI). As of 2015, Penang had nearly RM4.5 billion foreign direct investment (FDI), the largest amount in Malaysia, with significant investments going to the manufacturing sector. In addition, the Free Industrial Zone has helped propel the manufacturing sector to become one of the contributors to Penang's economy, getting 44.6% of Penang's total Gross Domestic Product (GDP) in 2016.

Service outsourcing 
In recent years, the Penang state government has allocated investments towards the development of the Bayan Baru township into a Business Processing Outsourcing (BPO) hub. These investments include the construction of Multimedia Super Corridor (MSC)-status infrastructure, such as SUNTECH Tower and One Precinct. A number of multinational firms, including Celestica, Keyence and Zurich Insurance, have already set up business outsourcing centres within the area as well.

Agriculture 

The adjacent neighbourhood of Batu Maung is home to an active fisheries industry. It contains a deepwater fishing port, as well as the headquarters of WorldFish Center, an international, non-profit fisheries research organisation, and the Fisheries Research Institute of Malaysia's Fisheries Development Authority.

Transportation

Air 

The Penang International Airport in Bayan Lepas is one of the busiest airports in Malaysia and serves as the major airport within the northern region of Peninsular Malaysia. Completed in 1935 when Penang was part of the British crown colony of the Straits Settlements, it is also the oldest civilian airport in the nation.

The airport's proximity to the Bayan Lepas Free Industrial Zone allows for the easy transportation of goods to and from the factories in Bayan Lepas. Furthermore, it connects Penang and the surrounding region with several major regional cities, including Kuala Lumpur, Singapore, Bangkok, Jakarta, Hong Kong, Guangzhou, Taipei, Ho Chi Minh City and Doha.

Land 

Bayan Lepas is conveniently connected to the Malay Peninsula via the Second Penang Bridge, which links Batu Maung on Penang Island with Batu Kawan in Seberang Perai. In addition, Bayan Lepas is connected to Penang's capital city, George Town, to the north via the Tun Dr Lim Chong Eu Expressway, and to Balik Pulau via Federal Route 6. Jalan Bayan Lepas, the main thoroughfare within the town, also forms part of the latter road.

Rapid Penang bus routes 302, 308, 401 and 401E include stops within Bayan Lepas proper, while the Penang International Airport is served by routes 102, 306, 401, 401E and AT. These routes link Bayan Lepas to various destinations on Penang Island, including George Town and its suburbs, as well as Balik Pulau and Teluk Kumbar. Aside from these routes, Rapid Penang operates an additional three cross-strait shuttle bus routes - BEST A, BEST B and BEST C - between the Bayan Lepas Free Industrial Zone and Seberang Perai on the mainland; the three routes mainly cater to industrial workers who reside on the mainland.

In 2017, LinkBike, a public bicycle sharing service based in George Town, launched its southernmost station at Queensbay Mall. This, along with the Summerton station nearby, provides bikers with an alternative mode of transportation between Bayan Lepas and the capital city.

Education 
There are 12 primary schools, five high schools and an international school within Bayan Lepas.

Primary schools

 SRK Batu Maung
 SRK Bayan Baru
 SRK Bayan Lepas
 SRK Bayan Lepas 2
 SRK Mutiara Perdana
 SRK Permatang Damar Laut
 SRK Sungai Ara
 SRJK (C) Chong Cheng
 SRJK (C) Chung Shan
 SRJK (C) Wen Khai
 SRJK (T) Bayan Lepas
 SRJK (T) Sungai Ara

High schools

 SMK Batu Maung
 SMK Bayan Lepas
 SMK Raja Tun Uda
 SMK Sungai Ara
 Heng Ee High School (Bayan Baru Branch)

International school
 Straits International School
In addition, the Penang Skills Development Centre (PSDC), an institute established by the Penang state government for tertiary-level industrial skills courses, is situated within the Bayan Lepas Free Industrial Zone.

Health care 
The 190-bed Pantai Hospital at Bayan Baru is the sole hospital within the vicinity of Bayan Lepas. The private hospital, opened in 1997, is now managed under Parkway Pantai's group of hospitals and offers specialist treatments for a variety of medical conditions.

Sports 

Completed in 2000, the SPICE Arena at Bayan Baru is one of the major sports venues in Penang, capable of hosting various indoor sports events such as squash, badminton and martial arts. It has also emerged as the preferred venue for meetings, incentives, conferences and exhibitions (MICE) within the state. The SPICE Arena is also complemented in its role as a MICE venue by the GBI-certified SPICE Convention & Exhibition Centre, the world's first hybrid solar-powered convention centre.

Adjacent to the SPICE Arena, the SPICE Aquatics Centre not only serves as a venue for national and international aquatic sports events, it also serves as a community swimming facility when not in use for tournaments.

Shopping 

Queensbay Mall, the largest shopping mall by area in Penang, is located near Bayan Baru.

Smaller shopping centres and hypermarkets have also been built within Bayan Baru to cater for a relatively sizeable catchment area.
 Sunshine Square
 Giant Bayan Baru Hypermarket
 D'Piazza Mall
 One Precinct
 Mayang Mall (to be redeveloped as GBS@Mayang)

Tourist attractions 

The Snake Temple is said to be the only Chinese temple in the world to be inhabited by snakes. Built in the 1850s, it has attracted species of pit vipers, which are believed to be rendered harmless by the incense. The temple is also a focal point of the annual Chinese New Year celebrations, during which a flame-watching ceremony is held to predict the fortunes of the following 12 months.

The Penang War Museum is located at Batu Maung near the southeastern tip of Penang Island. This former fort was converted into a museum in 2002 and features military installations, such as bunkers, tunnels and machine-gun emplacements, as built by the British Army in the 1930s.

References

External links

Southwest Penang Island District
Towns in Penang